White Rush is a 2003 film directed by Mark L. Lester and starring Judd Nelson. The plot concerns a group of young tourist couples who come across a drug deal gone bad.

Premise
A group of young tourist couples comes across a drug deal gone bad while on vacation.

Cast
Judd Nelson as Brian Nathanson
Tricia Helfer as Eva
Sandra Vidal as Solange  
Deborah Zoe as Arlene Gelb
Santino Ramos as Gang Member
Louis Mandylor as Chick

Production
Filming took place in Salt Lake City, Utah.

References

External links

2003 films
Films directed by Mark L. Lester
2003 crime thriller films
American crime thriller films
2000s English-language films
2000s American films